The 1998–99 Slovenian PrvaLiga season started on 2 August 1998 and ended on 13 June 1999. Each team played a total of 33 matches.

League table

Results

Matches 1–22

Matches 23–33

Top goalscorers

See also
1998–99 Slovenian Football Cup
1998–99 Slovenian Second League

References
General

Specific

External links
Official website of the PrvaLiga 

Slovenian PrvaLiga seasons
Slovenia
1998–99 in Slovenian football